Sem Verbeek (born 12 April 1994) is a Dutch tennis player.

Verbeek has a career high ATP doubles ranking of World No. 104 achieved on 1 November 2021. He has a career high singles ranking of World No. 531 achieved on 15 April 2019.

Professional career
Verbeek won his first ATP Challenger doubles title at the 2018 Winnipeg National Bank Challenger with Marc-Andrea Hüsler.

In July 2021 he reached his first ATP final at the 2021 Los Cabos Open partnering Hunter Reese.

ATP career finals

Doubles: 1 (1 runner-up)

Challenger and Futures finals

Doubles: 39 (26–13)

References

External links
 
 

1994 births
Living people
Dutch male tennis players
Tennis players from Amsterdam
20th-century Dutch people
21st-century Dutch people